The 2022 South American U-17 Women's Championship was the 7th edition of the South American U-17 Women's Championship, the biennial international youth football championship organised by CONMEBOL for the women's under-17 national teams of South America. It was held in Montevideo, Uruguay from 1 to 19 March 2022.

Initially, the 7th edition of the tournament was scheduled to be held in 2020 but had to be cancelled for that year due to the COVID-19 pandemic.

The top three teams qualified for the 2022 FIFA U-17 Women's World Cup in India as the CONMEBOL representatives. Defending champions Brazil won their fourth title after finish first in the final stage and alongside the runners-up Colombia and third place Chile qualified for the 2022 FIFA U-17 Women's World Cup.

Teams
All ten CONMEBOL member national teams are eligible to enter the tournament.

Venues

Uruguay was named as host country of the tournament at the CONMEBOL Council meeting held on 27 October 2021. The Estadio Charrúa in Montevideo will host all the matches.

Draw
The draw was held on 11 February 2022, 12:30 PYST (UTC−3), at the CONMEBOL headquarters in Luque, Paraguay. The hosts Uruguay and the title holders Brazil were seeded and assigned to the head of the groups A and B respectively. The remaining eight teams were split into four "pairing pots" (Colombia–Venezuela, Chile-Paraguay, Argentina-Peru, Ecuador-Bolivia) based on the final placement they reached in the last played edition of the tournament (shown in brackets).

From each pot, the first team drawn was placed into Group A and the second team drawn was placed into Group B. In both groups, teams from pot 1 were allocated in position 2, teams from pot 2 in position 3, teams from pot 3 in position 4 and teams from pot 4 in position 5.

The draw resulted in the following groups:

Match officials
On 4 February 2022, CONMEBOL informed to its member associations the referees appointed for the tournament.

 Gabriela Coronel
Assistants: María Eugenia Rocco and Carla Belén López
 Alejandra Quisbert
Assistants: Maricela Urapuca and Amalia Carrasco
 Andreza Siqueira
Assistants: Fernanda Gomes Antunes and Anne Kesy Gomes de Sa
 Yomara Salazar
Assistants: Leslie Vásquez and Marcia Castillo
 Paula Fernández
Assistants: Mayra Sánchez and Iris Alicia Alarcón

 Verónica Guazhambo
Assistants: Joselyn Romero and Stefania Paguay
 Angelina Rodas
Assistants: Nadia Weiler and Rossana Salinas
 Gaby Oncoy
Assistants: Thyty Rodríguez and Gabriela Moreno
 Nadia Fuques
Assistants: Luciana Mascaraña and Belén Clavijo
 María Eugenia Herrán
Assistants: Laura Cárdenas and Thaity Dugarte

Support Referees

 Antonella Álvarez

 Silvia Ríos

Squads

Players born between 1 January 2005 and 31 December 2007 are eligible to compete in the tournament. Each team could register a maximum of 22 and a minimum of 18 players, including at least 2 goalkeepers (Regulations Article 26).

First stage
In the first stage, the teams are ranked according to points earned (3 points for a win, 1 point for a draw, 0 points for a loss). If tied on points, tiebreakers are applied in the following order (Regulations Article 20):
Head-to-head result in games between tied teams;
Points in the matches played between the teams in question;
Goal difference in the matches played between the teams in question;
Number of goals scored in the matches played between the teams in question;
Goal difference in all group matches;
Number of goals scored in all group matches;
Fewest red cards received;
Fewest yellow cards received
Drawing of lots.

The top two teams of each group advance to the final stage.

All match times were in UYT (UTC−3), as listed by CONMEBOL.

Group A

Group B

Final stage
In the final stage, the teams are ranked according to points earned (3 points for a win, 1 point for a draw, 0 points for a loss). If tied on points, tiebreakers are applied in the following order, taking into account only matches in the final stage (Regulations Article 21):
Head-to-head result in games between tied teams;
Points in the matches played between the teams in question;
Goal difference in the matches played between the teams in question;
Number of goals scored in the matches played between the teams in question;
Goal difference in all group matches;
Number of goals scored in all group matches;
Fewest red cards received;
Fewest yellow cards received
Drawing of lots.

All match times are in UYT (UTC−3), as listed by CONMEBOL.

Goalscorers

Qualified teams for FIFA U-17 Women's World Cup
The following three teams from CONMEBOL qualify for the 2022 FIFA U-17 Women's World Cup.

1 Bold indicates champions for that year. Italic indicates hosts for that year.

References

External links

CONMEBOL Sudamericano Femenino Sub 17 Uruguay 2022, CONMEBOL.com

South American U-17 Women's Championship
Women's U-17
South American
South American
South American
International association football competitions hosted by Uruguay
South American
Youth sport in Uruguay